Jehizdan (also Romanized as Jehīzdān; also known as Jehezdān) is a village in Abarghan Rural District, in the Central District of Sarab County, East Azerbaijan Province, Iran. At the 2006 census, its population was 634, in 149 families.

References 

Populated places in Sarab County